KOYY (93.7 FM, "Y94") is a radio station broadcasting a Top 40 (CHR) format serving the Fargo-Moorhead metropolitan area. It first began broadcasting in 1965. The station is currently owned by Midwest Communications. All the offices and studios are located at 1020 S. 25th Street in Fargo, while its transmitter is located near Amenia.

History
 
The station signed on in 1965 as WDAY-FM with a beautiful music format. On January 1, 1983, the station changed to a Top 40 format, and broadcast commercial-free for the first several months. It was owned by Forum Communications, along with WDAY and WDAY-TV. For a period in the early 1990s, the station adopted a soft adult contemporary format and was renamed "Mix 93.7". It later reverted to the Y94 name, and was sold to James Ingstad of Fargo in 1996, and sold to Clear Channel in 2000, along with several other radio stations in the area.

On September 28, 2006, the Clear Channel station cluster in Fargo (including WDAY-FM) was sold back to James Ingstad, including KDAM, which signed on in 2002. The sale was approved by the Federal Communications Commission (FCC) on January 19, 2007. The station announced the sale to Midwest Communications on September 18, 2012 and the sale was finalized in 2013

Y94 is the Fargo-Moorhead affiliate of American Top 40.

On June 1, 2007, the antenna system used for Y94, KFNW-FM, and KRWK "Rock 102" caught fire, leading the stations to temporarily broadcast on auxiliary facilities at a lower power. The stations resumed full power on August 3, 2007.

Midwest Communications changed Y94's call letters to KOYY on December 16, 2015, retiring the heritage WDAY-FM calls which had been in use for 50 years.

Conan O'Brien job offer
On January 18, 2010, Conan O'Brien revealed that he was offered to be a morning show sidekick among other job offers.

References

External links
Y94 website

OYY
Contemporary hit radio stations in the United States
Radio stations established in 1965
Midwest Communications radio stations
1965 establishments in North Dakota